The 1987 MTV Video Music Awards aired live on September 11, 1987, from the Universal Amphitheatre in Los Angeles. Hosted by MTV VJs Downtown Julie Brown, Carolyne Heldman, Kevin Seal, Michael Tomioka, and Dweezil Zappa, the show honored the best music videos released from May 2, 1986, to May 1, 1987. 

Nominations from among 644 submissions were announced in August. The MTV Video Music Award for Best Video from a Film, which recognizes the most outstanding video of a song taken from a movie soundtrack, was included for the first time. The Special Recognition award—given out every year since 1984—was presented for the last time, after which it was eliminated from the award lineup altogether. Peter Gabriel set a record for the most VMA nominations earned in a single year with twelve: he received ten nominations for "Sledgehammer" and two for "Big Time". This would go uncontested until the 2010 ceremony, when Lady Gaga received thirteen nominations. Other major nominees included Genesis, Paul Simon, Steve Winwood, U2, and Madonna. Genesis, Winwood, and U2 all received seven nominations each, for "Land of Confusion", "Higher Love", and "With or Without You" respectively. Simon and Madonna received six nominations apiece, split between "The Boy in the Bubble" and "You Can Call Me Al" for the former, and "Papa Don't Preach" and "Open Your Heart" for the latter.

Gabriel was the most-awarded artist at the show, winning a record ten awards, including Video of the Year and the Video Vanguard Award, with "Sledgehammer"—the most-nominated video of the night—which won nine of the ten awards it was in the running for; it is the most-awarded video in VMA history. He did not attend in person to collect any of his awards as he was on tour in Germany. The only other act to win multiple awards was the rock band Talking Heads, whose video for "Wild Wild Life" won Best Group Video and Best Video from a Film.

Background
MTV announced in mid-June that the 1987 Video Music Awards would be held on September 11. The ceremony broadcast was preceded by a two-hour long Pre-Game Show segment, during which Penn & Teller highlighted the nominated videos.

Performances
Run-D.M.C.'s performance at the show marked the first time that a rap act appeared on the MTV stage.

Presenters
 Howie Mandel – presented Best New Artist in a Video
 Dweezil Zappa – introduced the nominees of the Viewer's Choice award and later briefly interviewed Los Lobos
 Laurie Anderson – presented the Video Vanguard Award to Peter Gabriel
 Richard Wilkins – briefly interviewed Glenn Frey and introduced the next presenter
 Cyndi Lauper – presented Most Experimental Video
 Tina Turner – presented Best Male Video
 Blake Clark – performed a short stand-up routine and introduced a "Randee of the Redwoods" video package
 Robbie Nevil – presented Best Overall Performance in a Video
 Kevin Seal – briefly interviewed Richard Page and introduced the next presenter
 Whoopi Goldberg – presented Best Stage Performance in a Video
 Vanna White – presented Best Choreography in a Video
 Marcel Vanthilt – briefly interviewed Herbie Hancock and introduced the next presenters
 Poison – presented Best Female Video
 Carolyne Heldman – briefly interviewed Cher, Ally Sheedy, Dan Schneider and Brian Robbins
 Bobcat Goldthwait – performed a short stand-up routine and introduced the winner of Best Art Direction in a Video
 Glenn Frey – presented the Special Recognition Award
 Kenny Loggins – presented Best Direction in a Video
 Steve Guttenberg – presented Best Video from a Film
 Sandra Bernhard – presented Best Concept Video
 Eddie Money – introduced the winner of Best Special Effects in a Video
 Michael Tomioka – briefly interviewed "Weird Al" Yankovic and introduced the next presenter
 Judy Tenuta – introduced the winners of Best Editing in a Video and Best Cinematography in a Video
 Robin Leach – introduced a video package on show-business scandals
 Stevie Nicks and Christine McVie – presented Best Group Video
 David Bowie – presented the Video Vanguard Award to Julien Temple
 Cher – presented Viewer's Choice
 Huey Lewis – presented Video of the Year

Winners and nominees
Nominations were announced on Wednesday August 5. Nominees were selected from among "644 videos acquired and exhibited for the first time on MTV between May 2, 1986, and May 1, 1987", and voted on by the National Video Academy, comprising 1500 representatives from the music and video industry who were selected by MTV's Video Awards Executive Committee. For the first time, voting for the Viewer's Choice award was carried out "via newspaper write-in ballots" from USA Today and "an 800 telephone number that MTV viewers can use...for two weeks at the end of August and the beginning of September".

Winners are listed first and highlighted in bold.

References

External links
 Official MTV site

1987
MTV Video Music Awards
MTV Video Music Awards
1987 in Los Angeles